Baggage Claim is a 2013 American romantic comedy film written and directed by David E. Talbert, based on his book of the same name. It stars Paula Patton, Derek Luke, Taye Diggs, Jill Scott, Adam Brody, Djimon Hounsou, Jenifer Lewis and Ned Beatty in his final film role. The film premiered on September 27, 2013.

Plot
Pathologically single, 30-something, "Trans-Alliance" airline flight attendant, Montana Moore (Paula Patton) is on a mission to get her overbearing, frequently married, mother (Jenifer Lewis) to stop pressuring her to get married. After being jilted by Graham (Boris Kodjoe), Seat 5C, her only prospect, just as her younger sister, Sheree (Lauren London), becomes engaged.

Montana and her friends, Sam (Adam Brody) and Gail Best (Jill Scott) devise a plan to help her find a potential husband before Sheree's wedding. Rifling through her old contact list on her phone, the pair come up with a "prospective suitors" list. Over the course of 30 days, Montana flies all over the country (with the help of a colorful team of coworkers) hoping to reconnect with a litany of ex-boyfriends that include Langston Jefferson Battle III (Taye Diggs), a misogynistic politician, Damon Diesel (Trey Songz), an irresponsible entertainer and Quinton Jamison (Djimon Hounsou), a commitment shy multi-billionaire.

Though her quest to find a husband proves to be a disaster, Montana is oblivious to the developing romance with William Wright (Derek Luke), her longtime best friend and next-door neighbour. On the night before the wedding, Sheree’s fiancé (Terrence Jenkins) reveals that he does not want to get married yet and that her mother was the one who pressured him to get married with Sheree right away.

Once Montana realizes that she does not need a husband to live a fulfilling life, she finally stands up to her mother and gets her proposal from "Mr. Wright."

Cast

Production
Stock footage of O'Hare International Airport (Chicago), Los Angeles International Airport (Los Angeles) and LaGuardia Airport (New York) along with the airlines serving these airports, were used in Baggage Claim. Scenes of the city skyscapes were extensively used to set the scene. One Boeing 737 was painted in the fictional "Trans-Alliance" airline livery. The Renaissance Schaumburg Convention Center Hotel (Chicago) is featured throughout the film. Beatty retired from acting and died in 2021.

Reception
On Rotten Tomatoes the film has an approval rating of 15%, based on 84 reviews, with an average rating of 3.79/10. The site's critical consensus reads, "'Baggage Claim' hits the same notes as a number of successful romantic comedies without establishing much personality of its own." On Metacritic, the film has a score of 34 out of 100, based on reviews from 27 critics, indicating "generally unfavorable reviews". Audiences surveyed by CinemaScore gave Baggage Claim an A− grade.

Owen Gleiberman of Entertainment Weekly wrote: "Paula Patton is such a terrific actress that even in the ultra-tacky romantic comedy Baggage Claim, she gives a luminous, thought-out performance, not just walking through but digging into the role of an eager, nervous doormat with a people-pleasing grin."
Sheri Linden of The Hollywood Reporter wrote: "A few smart laughs hint at what might have been, but thanks to sitcom-y mugging and a tepidness beneath the intended hilarity, David E. Talbert’s romantic comedy is stuck in a holding pattern for much of its running time."
Peter Debruge of Variety was critical of the film, in particular writer and director David E. Talbert, saying "instead of finding a fresh spin on old cliches, he merely repeats them" and he "hasn’t quite figured out how to adjust his directing technique from stage to screen. The production values are fine in an overly bright, sitcomish way, but the actors are capable of far more than their roles call for."

References

Notes

Citations

Bibliography

 Sharpe, Michael and Robbie Shaw. Boeing 737-100 and 200. St. Paul, Minnesota: MBI Publishing Company, 2001. .

External links
 
 
 
 

2013 films
2013 romantic comedy films
African-American comedy films
American aviation films
American independent films
2010s English-language films
Films directed by David E. Talbert
Films scored by Aaron Zigman
Films set in Los Angeles
Films shot in Chicago
Films set in New York City
Fox Searchlight Pictures films
2013 independent films
2010s American films
TSG Entertainment films